Zetin-e Sofla (also Romanized as Zetīn-e Soflá; also known as Zeytūn-e Soflá) is a village in Zilayi Rural District, Margown District, Boyer-Ahmad County, Kohgiluyeh and Boyer-Ahmad Province, Iran. At the 2006 census, its population was 190, in 36 families.

References 

Populated places in Boyer-Ahmad County